Jemma Dolan is an Irish Sinn Féin politician, elected to the Northern Ireland Assembly for the Fermanagh and South Tyrone constituency in the March 2017 elections.

Before Politics
From Belleek, County Fermanagh, Dolan previously worked for Sinn Féin in the EU Parliament and in Fermanagh and South Tyrone and is involved with her local GAA club. She is also a former independent member of the Fermanagh and Omagh Policing and Community Safety Partnership.

Dolan is a former vice president for Campaigns and Communications for the University of Ulster Students Union. Whilst in this role in 2014 she won the Welfare Campaign of the Year Award at the Student Achievement Awards Ireland for setting up a student mental health project.

Northern Ireland Assembly elections
Having never stood for political office before, the first time candidate polled 7,767 first preference votes, securing her MLA seat on the third count alongside her more established Sinn Féin running mate Michelle Gildernew. Her other more established Sinn Féin colleague, Seán Lynch, got elected on the fourth count.

Jemmma Dolan was once again selected by Sinn Féin to run for the 2022 Assembly election in the Fermanagh and South Tyrone constituency. She topped the poll, polling 9,067 first preference votes, and was elected on the first count. Her two running mates, Colm Gildernew and Áine Murphy, were elected on count eight after garnering 7,562 and 7,379 first preferences respectively.

Assembly career
Dolan currently sits on the Committee for Finance, the Committee for Justice and Ad Hoc Committee on the COVID-19 Response at the Assembly. She also sits on the All Party Group on Further and Higher Education, the All Party Group on Fair Banking and Finance, the All Party Group on Preventing Loneliness and the All Party Group on Suicide Prevention.

References

External links
 Sinn Féin page

Year of birth missing (living people)
Living people
Sinn Féin MLAs
Northern Ireland MLAs 2017–2022
Female members of the Northern Ireland Assembly
Place of birth missing (living people)
People from Belleek, County Fermanagh
Politicians from County Fermanagh
Northern Ireland MLAs 2022–2027
Alumni of Ulster University